Musicians of the Old Post Road (MOPR) is a chamber music ensemble based in the Boston area that specializes in period instrument performance. The ensemble often performs "rediscovered" works from the Baroque, Classical, and Romantic periods. The ensemble, founded by Artistic Directors Suzanne Stumpf and Daniel Ryan, performs in historical buildings along the Boston Post Road, which was a trade and travel route between Boston and New York City from the late 17th through mid-19th centuries. MOPR's repertoire spans these dates. The group has produced seven CDs, toured throughout Europe and North America, and received numerous awards, including the Noah Greenberg Award from the  American Musicological Society in 1998.

Notable performances and collaborations 

MOPR has toured both within the US and internationally. US appearances include the Boston Early Music Festival Concert Series, and the Indianapolis Early Music Festival.
 
MOPR has collaborated with La Fontegara of Mexico, Schola Cantorum of Boston, and Pamela Dellal, mezzo soprano.
 
The ensemble was also commissioned to build a program to accompany an exhibit at the MIT Museum. In 2006, the ensemble was featured on Boston's WCVB television’s Chronicle program about the history of the old Boston Post Road.

Rediscovered works and programming 

The ensemble frequently performs lesser-known, rediscovered works. In a 2008 interview, Stumpf stated ¨We enjoy finding works not often selected for performance and combining it with interesting ways to present it to our audience.¨ The ensemble presents these rediscovered works within contextualized programs.

Discography 

 Roman Handel
 Feliz Navidad
 Telemann Twelve Fantasias and Other Works
 Telemann and Bodinus Quartets
 Galant with an Attitude: Music of Juan and José Pla
 Trios and Scottish Song Settings of J.N. Hummel. The ensemble won the 1998 Noah Greenberg Award for this recording.
 The Virtuoso Double Bass

Members 

The ensemble is composed of five core members: Suzanne Stumpf, flute, Daniel Ryan, cello, Sarah Darling, violin, Michael Bahmann, harpsichord, and Marcia Cassidy, viola.

External links 
 Musicians of the Old Post Road
 Youtube of Musicians of the Old Post Road

References 

Chamber music groups
Musical groups from Boston